ESPN College Football Primetime is a live game presentation of NCAA Football Bowl Subdivision college football on ESPN. In the past, the presenting sponsors have been Polaroid, AT&T and Hilton.  The current presenting sponsor is PlayStation 5.  The game telecast airs every Saturday night at 7:45pm ET during the college football regular season. The game is preceded by a 45-minute-long College Football Scoreboard with Matt Barrie, Joey Galloway and Jesse Palmer, all of whom also appear on the halftime report.  This game telecast is also presented in high-definition on ESPN HD.

History
Since debuting in 1979, it has broadcast games from numerous conferences including the  ACC, Big Ten and the Big East Conference. In recent years, it has primarily featured the SEC as the second-choice game to CBS' national coverage earlier in the day.  Games from the other conferences typically could air either on ESPN/ESPN2 or ABC, but the SEC does not offer such flexibility.  This game is often seen as the ESPN Game of the Week along with the Thursday night telecast.

Some notable voices of ESPN College Football Primetime over the years have been Ron Franklin, Mike Gottfried and Adrian Karsten, but all have gone on to different assignments, except for Karsten, who died in 2005.  Currently, the primary commentators for the ESPN version are Sean McDonough on play-by-play, Todd Blackledge as analyst and Molly McGrath as field reporter.  The secondary commentators are Chris Fowler on play-by-play, Kirk Herbstreit as analyst and Holly Rowe as field reporter, all of whom also serve as the primary commentating team for ABC's Saturday Night Football.

On October 14, 2006, ESPN College Football Primetime aired on five different networks as part of ESPN Full Circle. The networks included ESPN, ESPN2, ESPNU, ESPN360 and Mobile ESPN.

Franklin-Rowe Incident
On October 1, 2005, in a game that Ron Franklin was calling along with Bob Davie, sideline reporter Holly Rowe called out Purdue defensive coordinator Brock Spack for using all three timeouts on defense despite trailing by four touchdowns late in the game. "If the coaches are giving up," Rowe added, "what does that say to the players?" Franklin responded: "Holly, it's not giving up. It's 49-21, sweetheart."

In response to that, Mo Davenport, senior coordinating producer for college football said, "It was an inappropriate comment, and we've communicated that to Ron. There's never a reason to say something so mean-spirited. Ron apologized. We dealt with it internally."

Personalities

Current
Sean McDonough: (play-by-play, 2018–present)
Todd Blackledge: (analyst, 2006–2022)
Molly McGrath: (field reporter, 2021–present)
Todd McShay: (field analyst/reporter, 2020–present) (select games)

Former
Erin Andrews: (field reporter, 2004, 2009)
Bob Davie: (analyst, 2005; also commentator for the August 30, 2008 game)
Ron Franklin: (play-by-play, 1990–2005; also commentator for the November 22, 2008 game)
Mike Gottfried: (analyst, 1990–2004)
Adrian Karsten: (field reporter, 1990–2003) (D)
Brad Nessler: (play-by-play, 2009–2015)
Mike Patrick: (play-by-play, 2006–2008)
Joe Tessitore: (play-by-play, 2016–2017)
Holly Rowe: (field reporter, 2005–2008, 2010–2019)

By year

Game features
Starting Lineups: The starting lineups are presented during the first possession of each team's offense and defense.
Chick-fil-A Impact Players: Following the starting lineups, McDonough and Blackledge run down the top two or three impact players on each teams side of the ball.
Halftime Report: The College Football Final crew of Matt Barrie, Joey Galloway and Jesse Palmer present the halftime report, which features analysis of the first half, highlights of earlier games and a look at other happenings in the sports world.
Studio Update: This segment appears during various time in the game, when Matt Barrie gives up to the minute highlights when something big happens in another game.
Primetime Pulse: Two or three times during the game, Matt Barrie shows a screen with live coverage of the ABC primetime game, the ESPN primetime game and the ESPN2 primetime game.
Todd's Taste of the Town: Usually shown in the second or third quarter, game analyst Todd Blackledge highlights a local eatery.

See also
College GameDay
College Football Scoreboard
College Football Final
ESPN College Football Thursday Primetime
ESPN2 College Football Saturday Primetime
Saturday Night Football

References

 

1984 American television series debuts
1990s American television series
2000s American television series
2010s American television series
ESPN original programming
American sports television series
Saturday